University of Technology is private university located in Jaipur, Rajasthan, India. It was established after the Rajasthan's assembly passed the University of Technology, Jaipur Bill,  Act No 28 of 2017.

Recognitions 
University of Technology  is recognized by Government of Rajasthan , All India Council for Technical Education, Bar Council of India, Association of Indian Universities, University Grants Commission (UGC) New Delhi, Pharmacy Council of India and Rehabilitation Council of India.

It has a memorandum of understanding with the Institute of Chartered Accountants of India (ICAI) and Institute of Company Secretaries of India (ICSI).

University is Accredited with ISO 21001:2018 for Educational Organizations Management System by IAF.

See Also 
 List of institutions of higher education in Rajasthan

References

External Links 
 

Universities and colleges in Jaipur
Private universities in India
Educational institutions established in 2017
2017 establishments in Rajasthan
Universities in Rajasthan